The Red Line Mass Transit System Project is a commuter rail system serving the Bangkok Metropolitan Region in Thailand. The construction began in January 2009 and free public trial operation began on 2 August 2021, with full commercial service to begin in November 2021 when Bang Sue Grand Station opens. It is a part of the Mass Rapid Transit Master Plan in Bangkok Metropolitan Region.

The system consists of two lines, one (also referred to as the SRT Dark Red Line) running from Thammasat University's Rangsit campus to Maha Chai in Samut Sakhon Province, and the other (SRT Light Red Line) running from Salaya in Nakhon Pathom Province to Hua Mak in Bangkok, with both passing through Bang Sue which will act as a connecting hub to the MRT system.

Most of the railway runs alongside existing national railway tracks, eventually replacing them. Segments running through inner-city areas are elevated, and the system is electrified by overhead lines. The system was developed and is owned by the State Railway of Thailand. Since the Red Lines run roughly along the alignment of the failed Hopewell Project, they have been described as a "Hopewell revival".

See also 
 Mass Rapid Transit Master Plan in Bangkok Metropolitan Region
 Greater Bangkok commuter rail

References

External links 
Construction Supervision of Mass Transit System Project in Bangkok (Red Line) Bang Sue - Rangsit Section

 
25 kV AC railway electrification